Charpentiera elliptica, the ellipticleaf pāpala, is an endangered species of flowering tree in the family Amaranthaceae, endemic to the island of Kauai in Hawaii.

References

Amaranthaceae
Trees of Hawaii
Endemic flora of Hawaii
Biota of Kauai
Plants described in 1896